Nikole Lewis is an astrophysicist and an assistant professor of Astronomy at Cornell University.

Career 
Her major research interests include observational and theoretical techniques for probing exoplanet atmospheres. She co-led a spectroscopic survey of the TRAPPIST-1 system in 2018 using the Hubble Space Telescope, which was the first such survey for Earth-sized exoplanets. She also took part in the original announcement of the TRAPPIST-1 system in 2017 by helping describe the system and the importance of detecting atmospheres to search for biosignatures.

References

External links 

 Astronomy Homepage at Cornell Univ.
 

Living people
21st-century American women scientists
20th-century American women scientists
American women astronomers
Cornell University faculty
Year of birth missing (living people)
University of Arizona alumni
Boston University alumni
Worcester Polytechnic Institute alumni
Planetary scientists
American women academics